Alexander Eduard Friedrich Eversmann (23 January 1794 – 14 April 1860) was a Prussian biologist and explorer.

Eversmann was born in Westphalia and studied at the universities of Marburg, Halle, Berlin and Dorpat. He received his degree of Philosophy and Master of Liberal Sciences at Halle in 1814, and at Dorpat graduated as a Doctor of Medicine and Surgery in 1817. During the next three years he travelled in the southern Urals, collecting specimens and sending them to Hinrich Lichtenstein at the university of Berlin.

Eversmann had for a long time planned to travel into central Asia to collect natural history specimens. He had studied the languages, customs and Muslim religion of the peoples of the area. In 1820 he set of for Bukhara disguised as a merchant, a journey he described in Reise Orenburg nach Buchara (1823), with a natural history appendix by Lichtenstein. In 1825 he travelled with a military expedition to Khiva. In 1828 he was appointed professor of zoology and botany at the university of Kazan. During the next thirty years he wrote numerous publications and is considered the pioneer of research into the flora and fauna of the southeast steppes of Russia between the Volga and the Urals.

His name is commemorated in a number of birds, such as Eversmann's redstart, butterflies, including Eversmann's parnassian and moths, such as Eversmann's rustic.

In the scientific field of herpetology he is best known for having described two new species of lizards, Darevskia praticola and Darevskia saxicola. A species of lizard, Crossobamon eversmanni, is named in his honor.

Works
1832. Lepidopterorum species nonnullae novae Gubernium Orenburgense incolentes. Nouvelles Memoires de la Societe imperiela des Naturalistes de Moscou. 2: 347–354, 2 cpls.
1841. Nachricht uber einige noch unbekannte Schmetterlinge des ostlichen Russlands. Bull. Soc. imp. Nat. Moscou 14(l): 18–33, 1 cpl. 
  (families Tenthredinidae and Uroceratae)
1848. Beschreibung einiger neuen Falter Russlands. Bull. Soc. imp. Nat. Moscou. 21 (3): 205–232.
  (family Sphegidae)  
1851. Description de quelques nouvelles espèces de Lépidoptères de la Russie. Bull. Soc. imp. Nat. Moscou. 24 (2): 610–644. 
1854. Beiträge zur Lepidopterologie Russlands. Bull. Soc. imp. Nat. Moscou. 27 (3): 174–205, 1 pl.

References

External links
Eversmann E (1840).  "Mittheilungen ueber einige neue und einige weniger gekannte Säugethiere Russlands ". Bulletin de la Société impériale des Naturalistes de Moscou 13 (1): 3-59. (in German).

Further reading
Mearns, Barbara; Mearns, Richard (1988). Biographies for Birdwatchers: The Lives of Those Commemorated in Western Palearctic Bird Names. Cambridge, Massachusetts: Academic Press. 464 pp. .

1794 births
1860 deaths
19th-century German botanists
19th-century German zoologists
German lepidopterists
German explorers
Explorers from the Russian Empire
Corresponding members of the Saint Petersburg Academy of Sciences
German emigrants to the Russian Empire